John Dawnay, 1st Viscount Downe (c. 1625 – 1 October 1695), known as Sir John Dawnay between 1660 and 1681, was an English politician who sat in the House of Commons between 1660 and 1690.

Dawnay was the son of John Dawnay of Womersley, Yorkshire and his wife Elizabeth Hutton, daughter of Sir Richard Hutton, a Judge of the King's Bench. He was baptised on 25 January 1625. He entered Gray's Inn and Jesus College, Cambridge in 1641.

In 1660, Dawnay was elected Member of Parliament for Yorkshire in the Convention Parliament. He was knighted on 2 June 1660. In 1661 he was elected MP  for Pontefract in the Cavalier Parliament. He was re-elected MP for Pontefract in the two elections of 1679. He was raised to the Peerage of Ireland as Viscount Downe on 19 February 1681. As this was an Irish peerage he could remain a member of the House of Commons and he was re-elected in 1681, 1685 and 1689. 

He commissioned the building of Cowick Hall in East Yorkshire in the late 17th century. Dawnay died in October 1695, aged 70, and was succeeded in the viscountcy by his son Henry.

Lord Downe was twice married. He married firstly Elizabeth Melton, daughter of Sir John Melton, in 1645. After her death in February 1662 he married secondly Dorothy Wickham, daughter of William Johnson, of Wickham, Lancashire, in 1663 Sir Christopher Dawnay, 1st Baronet, was his brother.

References

1625 births
1695 deaths
Viscounts in the Peerage of Ireland
Peers of Ireland created by Charles II
English MPs 1660
English MPs 1661–1679
English MPs 1679
English MPs 1680–1681
English MPs 1681
English MPs 1685–1687
English MPs 1689–1690
John